Edgar Nelson Gilbert (July 25, 1923 – June 15, 2013) was an American mathematician and coding theorist, a longtime researcher at Bell Laboratories whose accomplishments include the Gilbert–Varshamov bound in coding theory, the Gilbert–Elliott model of bursty errors in signal transmission, and the Erdős–Rényi model for random graphs.

Biography
Gilbert was born in 1923 in Woodhaven, New York. He did his undergraduate studies in physics at Queens College, City University of New York, graduating in 1943. He taught mathematics briefly at the University of Illinois at Urbana–Champaign but then moved to the Radiation Laboratory at the Massachusetts Institute of Technology, where he designed radar antennas from 1944 to 1946. He finished a Ph.D. in physics at MIT in 1948, with a dissertation entitled Asymptotic Solution of Relaxation Oscillation Problems under the supervision of Norman Levinson, and took a job at Bell Laboratories where he remained for the rest of his career. He retired in 1996.

He died following a fall in 2013 at Basking Ridge, New Jersey.

Research

Coding theory
The Gilbert–Varshamov bound, proved independently in 1952 by Gilbert and in 1957 by Rom Varshamov, is a mathematical theorem that guarantees the existence of error-correcting codes that have a high transmission rate as a function of their length, alphabet size, and Hamming distance between codewords (a parameter that controls the number of errors that can be corrected). The main idea is that in a maximal code (one to which no additional codeword can be added), the Hamming balls of the given distance must cover the entire codespace, so the number of codewords must at least equal the total volume of the codespace divided by the volume of a single ball. For 30 years, until the invention of Goppa codes in 1982, codes constructed in this way were the best ones known.

The Gilbert–Elliott model, developed by Gilbert in 1960 and E. O. Elliot in 1963, is a mathematical model for the analysis of transmission channels in which the errors occur in bursts. It posits that the channel may be in either of two different states, with different error rates, that errors occur independently of each other once the state is known, and that the changes from one state to the other are governed by a Markov chain. It is "very convenient and often used" in the analysis of modern communications systems such as data links to mobile telephones.

Probability theory
Central to the theory of random graphs is the Erdős–Rényi model, in which edges are chosen randomly for a fixed set of  vertices. It was introduced in two forms in 1959 by Gilbert, Paul Erdős, and Alfréd Rényi. In Gilbert's  form, each potential edge is chosen to be included in the graph or excluded from it, independently of the other edges, with probability . In contrast, in the  model introduced by Erdős and Rényi, the graph is chosen uniformly at random among all -edge graphs; the number of edges is fixed, but the edges are not independent of each other, because the presence of an edge in one position is negatively correlated with the presence of an edge in a different position. Although these two models end up having similar properties, the  model is often more convenient to work with due to the independence of its edges.

In the mathematics of shuffling playing cards, the Gilbert–Shannon–Reeds model, developed in 1955 by Gilbert and Claude Shannon and independently in unpublished work in 1981 by Jim Reeds, is a probability distribution on permutations of a set of  items that, according to experiments by Persi Diaconis, accurately models human-generated riffle shuffles. In this model, a deck of cards is split at a point chosen randomly according to a binomial distribution, and the two parts are merged with the order of merging chosen uniformly at random among all possible mergers. Equivalently, it is the inverse of a permutation formed by choosing independently at random for each card whether to put it into one of two piles (maintaining the original order of the cards within each pile), and then stacking the two piles on top of each other.

Gilbert tessellations are a mathematical model of crack formation introduced by Gilbert in 1967. In this model, fractures begin at a set of random points, with random orientations, chosen according to a Poisson process, and then grow at a constant rate until they terminate by running into previously formed cracks.

Random geometric graphs
In 1961, Gilbert introduced the random plane network (more commonly referred to now as a random geometric graph (RGG), or Gilbert Disk model) where points are placed on the infinite plane using a suitable Point Process and nodes connect if and only if they are within some critical connection range R; wireless communication networks were suggested as the main the application for this work. From this formulation a simple result follows that for a stationary Poisson point process in ℝ with density λ the expected degree of each node is the number of points found within the connectivity range, namely, πλR. A natural question to ask after formulating such a graph is what is the critical mean degree to ensure there is a giant component; in essence this question gave rise to the field of continuum percolation theory. By using a branching process Gilbert was able to provide an initial lower bound for the critical mean degree (equivalently the critical transmission range). By choosing an arbitrary point in the process (call this the zeroth generation), find all points within a connection distance R (first generation). Repeat the process for all points in the first generation ignoring any previously found and continue this process until it dies out. The associated branching process is one where the mean number of offspring is a Poisson random variable with intensity equal to the mean degree in the original RGG (πλR). From here only standard branching process techniques need be applied to obtain a lower bound. Furthermore, Gilbert showed that by reframing the problem into one about bond percolation, an upper bound for the giant component can obtained. The method consists of discritizing the plane such that any two nodes in adjacent squares are connected; and allowing each square to represents an edge on the lattice. By construction, if there is a giant component in the bond percolation problem then there must be a giant component in the RGG.

Other contributions
Gilbert did important work on the Steiner tree problem in 1968, formulating it in a way that unified it with network flow problems. In Gilbert's model, one is given a flow network in which each edge is given both a cost and a capacity, and a matrix of flow amounts between different pairs of terminal vertices; the task is to find a subnetwork of minimum cost whose capacities are sufficient to support a flow with the given flow amounts between any pair of terminals. When the flow amounts are all equal, this reduces to the classical Steiner tree problem.

Gilbert discovered Costas arrays independently of and in the same year as Costas, and is also known for his work with John Riordan on counting necklaces in combinatorics. He collaborated with Fan Chung, Ron Graham, and Jack van Lint on partitions of rectangles into smaller rectangles.

Selected publications

References

1923 births
2013 deaths
American mathematicians
American information theorists
Probability theorists
Coding theorists
Queens College, City University of New York alumni
University of Illinois Urbana-Champaign faculty
MIT Department of Physics alumni
Scientists at Bell Labs
People from Woodhaven, Queens
Mathematicians from New York (state)